Apallaga is a genus of skippers in the family Hesperiidae.

Species
Recognised species in the genus Apallaga include:
 Apallaga fulgens (Mabille, 1877)
 Apallaga mokeezi (Wallengren, 1857)
 Apallaga opalinus (Butler, 1900)
 Apallaga oreas Libert, 2014
 Apallaga pooanus (Aurivillius, 1910)
 Apallaga rutilans (Mabille, 1877)

References

Natural History Museum Lepidoptera genus database

Hesperiidae genera
Celaenorrhinini